Thomas Enqvist and Mark Philippoussis defeated the defending champions Greg Rusedski and Fabrice Santoro in the final, 6–7(6–8), 3–6 to win the gentlemen's invitation doubles tennis title at the 2013 Wimbledon Championships.

Draw

Final

Group A
Standings are determined by: 1. number of wins; 2. number of matches; 3. in two-players-ties, head-to-head records; 4. in three-players-ties, percentage of sets won, or of games won; 5. steering-committee decision.

Group B
Standings are determined by: 1. number of wins; 2. number of matches; 3. in two-players-ties, head-to-head records; 4. in three-players-ties, percentage of sets won, or of games won; 5. steering-committee decision.

References
Draw

Men's Invitation Doubles